The 1990 Berlin Marathon was the 17th running of the annual marathon race held in Berlin, West Germany, held on 30 September 1990. Australia's Steve Moneghetti won the men's race in 2:08:16 hours, while the women's race was won by East Germany's Uta Pippig in 2:28:37.

Results

Men

Women

References 

 Results. Association of Road Racing Statisticians. Retrieved 2020-04-02.

External links 
 Official website

1990 in Berlin
Berlin Marathon
Berlin Marathon
Berlin Marathon
Berlin Marathon